Sofija Jovanović (1895–1979) was a Serbian war heroine who fought in the Balkan Wars and the First World War.

Life
Sofija Jovanović was born in 1895 in Belgrade. Her father was a butcher from Dorćol. After the Annexation Crisis of 1908, the organization Narodna Odbrana was founded in Belgrade, which recruited and equipped volunteers and formed Chetnik detachments for the upcoming liberation wars. She managed to convince them to let her join a Chetnik unit during both Balkan Wars.

She joined the Serbian Army under the male name Sofronije Jovanović immediately upon the start of World War I and the first attack of Austria on Serbia. She fought in Belgrade in October 1915 against the armies of Germany and Austria-Hungary. In July 1914, as part of the Srem Volunteer Detachment, she commanded the first group of Serbian fighters who crossed the Sava to Srem to reconnoiter enemy positions and cut telephone wires to Zemun. She then took part in the battles of the Drina and Kolubara. In 1915.
She survived the Serbian army's retreat through Albania (winter 1915–16). She then fought with the Serbian army during the breakthrough of the Salonika front and the subsequent liberation of Serbia and Belgrade in November 1918.

She was nicknamed  (The Serbian Joan of Arc) by French reporters. She was wounded in the war, lost part of her foot and became disabled. She was awarded 13 decorations for her heroism.

See also
Chetniks in the Balkan Wars
Milunka Savić
Antonija Javornik
Flora Sandes
Leslie Joy Whitehead
Women in the military

References

Sources

External links

1895 births
1979 deaths
Burials at Belgrade New Cemetery
Female wartime cross-dressers
Serbian military personnel of World War I
Serbian soldiers
Serbian women
Serbian women in World War I
Women soldiers
Chetniks in the Balkan Wars
Royal Serbian Army soldiers
19th-century Serbian women
20th-century Serbian people
20th-century Serbian women